"That Was Then but This Is Now" is a song by English pop band ABC. It was released in October 1983 as the lead single from their second studio album, Beauty Stab. It was the band's third entry on the US Billboard Hot 100, peaking at No. 89.

Music video
The music video shows them playing on a stage behind a huge Risk-style world map gameboard; scenes of the band playing, accompanied by various flags, are interspersed with scenes of a helicopter taking off and then exploding.

Criticism
The song features the heavily criticised lyric, "Can't complain, mustn't grumble, help yourself to another piece of apple crumble." Roddy Frame of Aztec Camera censured the line, feeling that it embodied all that was wrong with 1980s pop music. It has frequently appeared in "worst lyrics" poll results, and was voted the worst line ever in a 2007 BBC 6 Music survey. Critic and Saint Etienne co-founder Bob Stanley allowed, "It had perhaps been meant as a joke - it was followed by a cheesy sax break."

Track listing
"That Was Then but This Is Now" – 3:33
"Vertigo" – 1:53

Chart performance

References

External links
 

1983 singles
ABC (band) songs
Songs written by Martin Fry
1983 songs
Mercury Records singles
Songs written by Mark White (musician)
Songs written by Stephen Singleton
Song recordings produced by Gary Langan